Joseph Gerard Desaulniers (December 31, 1928 - November 26, 1984) was a Canadian professional ice hockey forward who played 8 games in the National Hockey League for the Montreal Canadiens. Desaulniers was born in Shawinigan Falls, Quebec.

External links
 

1928 births
1984 deaths
Canadian ice hockey forwards
Ice hockey people from Quebec
Montreal Canadiens players
Sportspeople from Shawinigan